Punk Rock is Your Friend: Kung Fu Records Sampler No. 6 is the sixth compilation album by the Seal Beach, California record label Kung Fu Records, released in 2005. It features artists signed to the label at the time, as well as others who were not signed to the label but had participated in some of their releases such as The Show Must Go Off! live DVD series. It is subtitled "Hardcore is Your Friend, Too" as it contains several tracks meant to showcase the label's new hardcore imprint Broken Sounds Records.

Track listing
The Vandals - "I am Crushed" (from Hollywood Potato Chip)
Dance Hall Crashers - "Lost Again" (live) (from Live at the House of Blues L.A.)
Audio Karate - "She Looks Good" (previously unreleased)
Useless I.D. - "Pink Stars and Magazines" (from Redemption)
Tsunami Bomb - "My Machete" (from The Definitive Act)
Underminded - "Bring on the Flood" (from Hail Unamerican!)
Cooper - "Summers Day"
Versus the World - "If I Died" (previously unreleased)
Righteous Jams - "Righteous Jams" (from Rage of Discipline)
The Bouncing Souls - "Kids and Heroes" (live) (from Live at the Glasshouse)
Faulter - "Sixes and Sevens" (from Darling Buds of May)
The God Awfuls - "Sister" (from Next Stop Armageddon)
The Getaway - "East End Blood Bath" (from Take It Back)
Throw Rag - "Hang Up" (live) (from Live at the House of Blues)
xdeathstarx - "Aftermath" (previously unreleased)
Audio Karate - "Gypsy Queen" (from Lady Melody)
Circle Jerks - "World Up My Ass" (live) (from Live at the House of Blues)
Tsunami Bomb - "TB vs. the Monster" (previously unreleased)
Suffocate Faster - "Can't Speak"
H2O - "Guilty by Association" (live) (previously unreleased)
Righteous Jams - "Green Eyes" (from Rage of Discipline)
Underminded - "Hail Unamerican!"  (from Hail Unamerican!)
The Vandals - "My Neck, My Back" (Ikioi mix) (from Shingo Japanese Remix Album)

Album information
Record label: Kung Fu Records
Art direction by Tony Vitali

Kung Fu Records compilation albums
2005 compilation albums
Punk rock compilation albums
Record label compilation albums